Matthew Mead (August 20, 1736 – February 26, 1816) was a Lieutenant Colonel who served on George Washington's staff in the American Revolutionary War. He was a member of the Connecticut House of Representatives from Norwalk in the sessions of May 1779, May and October 1780, May and October 1781.

Early life and family 
He was born on August 20, 1736, in Norwalk. He was the son of Jeremiah Mead and Hannah St. John.

Mead enlisted in the army on September 8, 1755, as a private in Captain Samuel Hanford's Company, French and Indian War. In 1758 he was Quartermaster of the 4th Regiment in the expedition against Crown Point and Ticonderoga.

He married Phebe Whelpey on February 7, 1759, in Wilton.

In 1773 he was commissioned Captain of the Wilton company in the Norwalk, Connecticut Militia. At the outbreak of the Revolution he was commissioned Captain of the 5th Regiment of Connecticut, Continental Line.
In 1777 he was made Lieutenant Colonel of the 5th Regiment. In that year he was in the Battle of Germantown,
Philadelphia. He commanded the 8th Regiment of Connecticut, Continental Line, at Valley Forge. He resigned his commission on 25 May 1778 after the winter of 1777-78 at Valley Forge, where he was quartered with his Regiment and was on the staff of General Washington.

He served as a member of the Connecticut House of Representatives from Norwalk in the sessions of May 1779, May and October 1780, and May and October 1781.

References 

1736 births
1816 deaths
Connecticut militiamen in the American Revolution
Members of the Connecticut House of Representatives
Politicians from Norwalk, Connecticut
Military personnel from Connecticut